Vendetta may refer to:
 Feud or vendetta, a long-running argument or fight

Film 
 Vendetta (1919 film), a film featuring Harry Liedtke
 Vendetta (1950 film), an American drama produced by Howard Hughes
 Vendetta (1986 film), an American action film
 Vendetta (1995 film), a Swedish film
 Vendetta (1996 film), a film featuring Richard Lynch
 Vendetta (1999 film), an HBO crime drama
 Vendetta (2013 film), a British film
 Vendetta (2015 film), an American film
 Vendetta (2017 film), an American pornographic film
 Vendetta (2022 film), an action thriller starring Bruce Willis

Literature
La Vendetta (novel), a novel by Honoré de Balzac
Vendetta (Dibdin novel), by Michael Dibdin
Vendetta (Star Trek), a novel by Peter David
Vendetta: Lucky's Revenge, a novel by Jackie Collins
Vendetta, a novel by Derek Lambert
Vendetta!, an 1886 novel by Marie Corelli
"A Vendetta", an 1883 short story by Guy de Maupassant

Music 
 Vendetta Records, a record label

Bands
 Vendetta (German band), a metal group
 Vendetta (Spanish band), a ska/punk rock band
 Vendetta, a punk band in Brazil

Albums 
 Vendetta (Celesty album)
 Vendetta (Mic Geronimo album)
 Vendetta: First Round, an EP by Ivy Queen
 Vendetta (Ivy Queen album)
 Vendetta (Throwdown album)
 Vendetta (Zemfira album)

Songs 
 "Vendetta", a song by Slipknot from All Hope Is Gone
 "Vendetta", a song by Andy Mineo from Uncomfortable
 "Vendetta", a song by Chelsea Collins

Television 
 Vendetta (TV series), a 1966–1968 BBC series starring Stelio Candelli
 Vendetta (Armenian TV series), a 2016 Armenian romantic drama television series
 "Vendetta" (Arrow), a 2012 episode of Arrow
 "Vendetta" (Batman: The Animated Series), a 1992 episode of Batman: The Animated Series
 "The Vendetta" (Dynasty), a 1986 episode of Dynasty
 "Vendetta" (Warehouse 13), a 2010 episode of Warehouse 13
 Vendetta (Making Fiends), a character in Making Fiends

Video games
Vendetta (1989 video game), a video game by System 3
Vendetta (1991 video game), an arcade game by Konami
 Vendetta Online, a 2004 science fiction MMORPG
 Vendetta, a mission in Call of Duty: World at War.

Other uses
 HMAS Vendetta (D69), a V-class destroyer commissioned into the Royal Navy in 1917
 HMAS Vendetta (D08), a Daring-class destroyer commissioned in 1958
 Vendetta, a perfume by Valentino
 Vendetta, a guitar by Dean Guitars

People with the surname
 David Vendetta (born 1968), French DJ

See also 
 Def Jam Vendetta, a 2003 fighting game by Electronic Arts
 HMAS Vendetta, a list of ships of the Royal Australian Navy
 La Vendetta (disambiguation)
 V for Vendetta (disambiguation)